Tuscaridium is a genus of phaeodarian, (formerly thought to be radiolarians). The genus contains bioluminescent species. It one of two known bioluminescent phaeodarean genera, the other being Aulosphaera.

Species
The following species are known (incomplete list):
 Tuscaridium cygneum

References

Phaeodaria
Cercozoa genera
Bioluminescent phaeodarians